Lucchetta is an Italian surname. Notable people with the surname include:

Andrea Lucchetta (born 1962), Italian volleyball player
Dino Lucchetta (born 1968), Italian rowing coxswain
Leonida Lucchetta (born 1911), Italian footballer
Pier Paolo Lucchetta (born 1963), Italian volleyball player

Italian-language surnames